Contubernium may refer to
 Contubernium, quasi-marital relationship involving slaves in ancient Rome
 Contubernium (Roman army unit)